Vactor may refer to:

People

 David Van Vactor (1906–1994), American classical composer
 Ted Vactor (born 1944), American football player

Vehicles

 Vacuum truck, sometimes referred to as vactors or vactor trucks

Occupation

 Virtual actor

See also

 Victor (name)